Chanturia is a Georgian surname, which may refer to:

Akaki Chanturia, (1881-1941), Georgian ethnographer
Giorgi Chanturia, (1959-1994), Georgian politician
Vladimer Chanturia, Georgian boxer
Grigol Chanturia (born 1973), Georgian footballer
Giorgi Chanturia (footballer), Georgian footballer
Irine Sarishvili-Chanturia, Georgian politician
 

Surnames of Georgian origin
Georgian-language surnames